Pseudocotalpa andrewsi, known generally as the Andrews dune scarab beetle or Andrews dune beetle, is a species of shining leaf chafer in the family Scarabaeidae. It is endemic to the Algodones Dunes in California.

References

Further reading

 
 
 

Rutelinae
Beetles of the United States
Endemic fauna of California
Beetles described in 1971
Articles created by Qbugbot
Fauna without expected TNC conservation status